Lonicera ruprechtiana, the Manchurian honeysuckle, is a deciduous honeysuckle in the family Caprifoliaceae, native to Northeast Asia. 

It was first described by Eduard August von Regel.

References 

 

ruprechtiana
Taxa named by Eduard August von Regel
Flora of Asia